Americobdella is a genus of carnivorous leeches from southern Chile, comprising only the species Americobdella valdiviana.

Taxonomy
Philippi, who originally classified A. valdiviana as an erpobdellid leech, noted that Americobdella valdiviana was similar to Trocheta (now synonymized with Erpobdella) "in both appearance and habit". It is phylogenically between two major groups of leeches, the Rhynchobdellida and the Arhynchobdellida. Recent work has suggested A. valdiviana is more closely related to the Erpobdelliformes than the Hirudiniformes.

Description
Americobdella valdiviana is a predator and has only rudimentary jaws. Because of these features, it was originally classified as an erpobdellid leech. A. valdiviana is grey-coloured on the dorsal side with a yellowish ventral side. Whether eyes are present in this species is a matter of debate. While Philippi originally described Americobdella valdiviana as having no eyes, other authors have indicated that eyes are indeed present.

Diet
A. valdiviana feeds on earthworms.

References

Leeches
Monotypic protostome genera
Endemic fauna of Chile